Edward Lamar Johnstone  (March 15, 1884 – May 21, 1919) was an American silent film actor and director.

Biography
Born in Fairfax, Virginia, Johnstone starred in 82 films as an actor between 1911 and his death in 1919. He often starred alongside Dorothy Gibson, an actress who survived the sinking of the Titanic.

Johnstone directed three films; one in 1913 called Truth in the Wilderness, starring Charlotte Burton, The Turning Point (1914), and The Unforgiven (1915). In the 1916 serial Secret of the Submarine, Johnstone got to fly Juanita Hansen in a Curtiss Model D pusher biplane.

He died on May 21, 1919, in Palm Springs, California.

Partial filmography
 Robin Hood (1912)
 The Lady Killer (1913)
 Sapho (*uncredited) (1913)
 Through a Telescope (1913)
 The Secret of the Submarine (1915)
 The Tongues of Men (1916)
 Ben Blair (1916)
 That Devil, Bateese (1918)
 The Girl of My Dreams (1918)
 The Sheriff's Son (1919)
 The Spite Bride (1919)
 Diane of the Green Van (1919)
 Wolves of the Night (1919)
 The Lone Star Ranger (1919)

References

External links
 
 Portrait of Lamar Johnstone by Thomas Staedeli

1884 births
1919 deaths
American male silent film actors
Silent film directors
Male actors from Virginia
Actors from Fairfax, Virginia
20th-century American male actors